Heraclides or Heracleides was a Macedonian painter, who was at first merely a marine painter of sea and ships, but afterwards acquired some distinction as a painter in encaustic. He lived in the time of Perseus, after whose fall he went to Athens (168 BC).

References
Dictionary of Greek and Roman Biography and Mythology : Heracleides.28
Pliny the Elder, Natural History, xxxv.135

Ancient Macedonian painters
Ancient Greek painters
Marine artists
2nd-century BC Macedonians
Ancient Macedonians in Athens